The Order of the Phoenix is an order of Greece, established on 13 May 1926, by the republican government of the Second Hellenic Republic to replace the defunct Royal Order of George I.

The order was retained after the restoration of the monarchy in 1935 and continues to be awarded by the current Third Republic.

The honour is bestowed by the Greek government to Greek citizens who have excelled in the arts and literature, science, public administration, shipping, commerce, and industry. It is also awarded to foreigners who have helped raise Greece's international prestige.

Grades
The Order has five classes:
 Grand Cross ('Μεγαλόσταυρος') - wears the badge of the Order on a sash on the right shoulder, and the star of the Order on the left chest;
 Grand Commander ('Ανώτερος Ταξιάρχης') - wears the badge of the Order on a necklet, and the star of the Order on the right chest;
 Commander ('Ταξιάρχης') - wears the badge of the Order on a necklet;
 Officer or Gold Cross ('Χρυσούς Σταυρός') - wears the badge on a ribbon on the left chest;
 Member or Silver Cross ('Αργυρούς Σταυρός') - wears the badge on a ribbon on the left chest.

Insignia
The badge of the Order is a white-enameled cross, in silver for the Silver Cross class, in gold for the higher classes, with the Phoenix (symbolizing the rebirth of the Hellenic nation) at the centre. A five-pointed star is at the upper arm of the cross. The first version of the Order (1926–1935) featured the letters "E-T-T-A" in Byzantine uncial on each arm of the cross, the initials of the motto Εκ της τέφρας μου αναγεννώμαι ("From my ashes I am reborn"). During the Monarchy (1935–1974) the letters were removed and the badge was topped by a crown, while the badge's reverse side featured the monogram of the reigning monarch. The current version (since 1975) omits the crown, while the reverse features the Greek National Emblem with the words ΕΛΛΗΝΙΚΗ ΔΗΜΟΚΡΑΤΙΑ ("Hellenic Republic").

The star of the Order is a silver eight-pointed star with straight rays, with the phoenix at the centre; during the Monarchy it was topped by a crown.

The ribbon of the Order is orange with black edges.

Crossed swords on the insignia indicate that the award was given in the military division of the Order.

Holders

References

External links

 Presidency of the Hellenic Republic – The Order of the Phoenix
 The Greek Royal Orders
 George J. Beldecos, "Hellenic Orders, Decorations and Medals", pub. Hellenic War Museum, Athens 1991, .

Phoenix (Greece)
1926 establishments in Greece
Awards established in 1926
Phoenix (Greece)